József Somogyi (born 23 May 1968) is a Hungarian football player who has played at attacking midfielder.

Club career
His previous club is Győri ETO, Siófok, Csepel, MATÁV SC Sopron, Yukong Elephants in South Korea, Hapoel Kfar Saba in Israel, and SC-ESV Parndorf in Austria.

External links 
 
 

Hungarian footballers
Hungary international footballers
Hungarian expatriate footballers
Association football midfielders
Győri ETO FC players
Jeju United FC players
Hapoel Kfar Saba F.C. players
K League 1 players
Expatriate footballers in South Korea
Hungarian expatriate sportspeople in South Korea
Expatriate footballers in Israel
Hungarian expatriate sportspeople in Israel
Expatriate footballers in Austria
Hungarian expatriate sportspeople in Austria
1968 births
Living people